Mulholland Falls: Original MGM Motion Picture Soundtrack is an album by American pianist Dave Grusin released in 1996 by the Edel America label. This album is the soundtrack to the motion picture Mulholland Falls, directed by Lee Tamahori.

Track listing
All tracks composed by Dave Grusin except where noted
"Mulholland Falls" – 4:34
"Just a Girl..." – 2:48
"Hurting for Allison" – 3:33
"Flashback & Revelation" – 3:04
"Kate's Theme/The End of Jimmy" – 3:06
"Nuclear Madness/Hats in the Desert" – 4:15
"Home Movies" – 1:43
"It's Over/Flashback" – 3:01 
"Separation" – 1:33
"To the Base/Fallout for Timms" – 3:25
"Finale: Hats Off" – 2:56
"No Common Ground/End Credits" – 6:50    
"Harbor Lights" (Wilhelm Grosz, Jimmy Kennedy) – 3:22

Other music in the film
"That Certain Party" (Walter Donaldson, Gus Kahn) – Dean Martin
"Who Me?" (Frank Foster) – Count Basie
"So Tired" – Kay Starr

Personnel
Dave Grusin - Acoustic Piano, Synthesizer, Conductor

External links
[ ''Mulholland Falls'] Soundtrack at Allmusic
Dave Grusin-Mulholland Falls at Discogs

1996 albums
GRP Records albums
Dave Grusin soundtracks
Crime film soundtracks
1996 soundtrack albums